The City of Canterbury Bankstown (also known as Canterbury-Bankstown Council) is a local government area located in the South Western region of Sydney, New South Wales, Australia. The council was formed on 12 May 2016 from a merger of the City of Canterbury and the City of Bankstown, after a review of local government in New South Wales by the state government.

The current Mayor of Canterbury-Bankstown is Khal Asfour, the final Mayor of Bankstown and a member of the Labor Party, who was first elected on 26 September 2017 as the inaugural Mayor.

History

Early history

The traditional Aboriginal inhabitants of the land now known as the Canterbury-Bankstown were the Dharug (Darag, Daruk, Dharuk) and Eora peoples. Early indigenous groups relied upon the riparian network of the Georges River and Cooks River catchments towards Botany Bay, with extant reminders of this lifestyle dating back 3,000 years including rock and overhang paintings, stone scrapers, middens and axe grinding grooves.

Following the arrival of Europeans in 1788, the new British settlers in the area burned oyster shells from the middens along Cooks River to produce lime for use in building mortar. The first incursions and eventual land grants in the area by Europeans led to increasing tensions, culminating in a confrontation between Europeans and a group of Aboriginal people led by Tedbury, the son of Pemulwuy, in what is now Punchbowl in 1809. However, following Tedbury's death in 1810, resistance to European settlement generally ended.

In 1793, the eastern Canterbury area's first land grant was made to the chaplain of the First Fleet, the Reverend Richard Johnson, and given the name Canterbury Vale. The District of Bankstown was named by Governor Hunter in 1797 in honour of botanist Sir Joseph Banks. The area remained very rural until residential and suburban development followed the development of the Bankstown Railway Line with the passing of the Marrickville to Burwood Road Railway Act by the NSW Parliament in 1890, extending the rail line from Marrickville Station (later Sydenham Station) to Burwood Road (later Belmore Station) by 1895. With the passing of the Belmore to Chapel Road Railway Act in 1906, the line was extended further to Lakemba, Punchbowl and Bankstown by 1909.

Local government history

Canterbury

After much petitioning of the State Government by local residents, the Municipality of Canterbury was proclaimed on 17 March 1879. The council first met in the home of the first mayor, Alderman John Sproule, and premises were then leased in the St Paul's Church schoolroom at 47-49 Canterbury Road, Canterbury. The Canterbury Town Hall, located on Canterbury Road between Canton and Howard Streets, was opened in 1889 by the Premier of New South Wales, Sir Henry Parkes. However, over time, Campsie became a more important centre, particularly along Beamish Street and Canterbury Council planned a gradual move of civic services there when funds became available. In 1954 a Baby Health Centre by Davey & Brindley opened on Beamish Street, followed by a library next door by Davey, Brindley & Vickery in 1958 at a cost of £30,000, and the municipal administration finally moved in 1963. At the time of its opening by the mayor R. J. Schofield on 26 September 1958, the Campsie Library was reputed to be the largest municipal library in Sydney. The Canterbury Municipal Administration Building designed by architects Whitehead & Payne, built by Rex Building Company Pty Ltd, and completed at a cost of £163,000 was opened adjacent to the Library and Baby Health Centre by the mayor, James S. Scott, on 21 September 1963. The City of Canterbury was proclaimed on 16 November 1993 by the Governor of New South Wales, Rear Admiral Peter Sinclair.

Bankstown

In March 1895 a petition was submitted to the NSW Colonial Government by 109 residents of the Bankstown area, requesting the establishment of the "Municipal District of Bankstown" under the Municipalities Act, 1867. The petition was subsequently accepted and the "Municipal District of Bankstown" was proclaimed by Lieutenant Governor Sir Frederick Darley on 7 September 1895. The first six-member council, standing in one at-large constituency, was elected on 4 November 1895. With the passing of the Local Government Act 1906, the council area became known as the "Municipality of Bankstown".

Bankstown's city status was proclaimed in 1980 in the presence of Queen Elizabeth II, becoming the "City of Bankstown".

Establishment of Canterbury-Bankstown Council

The council was initially under the management of Administrator Richard Colley until elections were held. The first meeting of the council was held at Bankstown Council Chambers on 24 May 2016. The former Bankstown General Manager, Matthew Stewart was proclaimed as the first General Manager of the council. Jim Montague PSM, Canterbury Council General Manager from 1983 to 2016, was initially proclaimed as a Deputy General Manager of the new Council, but retired two weeks after the proclamation.

At the first council meeting on 24 May 2016, the administrator, Richard Colley, resolved to adopt city status and the council name would be known as the "City of Canterbury Bankstown" by way of changing the council's trading name and business registration. However, as this act merely changed the trading name of the council, the legal name as proclaimed in 2016 remains "Canterbury-Bankstown Council", which can only be changed by official proclamation in the NSW Government Gazette under section 206 of the Local Government Act, 1993.

Proposed de-amalgamation
In 2021, the council began resolving a proposal to de-amalgamate the City of Canterbury Bankstown. The de-amalgamation would restore the former City of Canterbury and City of Bankstown to their original boundaries. In July 2022, the council began preparations to submit a business case to the NSW government for approval.

Suburbs in the local government area
 are:

Bankstown area:

 

 

One Tree Point

 

 

Canterbury area:
 
 

 

 

 
 

 

 

Notes

Demographics

Council
The Council comprises fifteen Councillors elected proportionally, with three Councillors elected in five wards. On 9 September 2017 the current Council was elected for a fixed term of office. Although the fixed term of the council is typically four years, due to delays caused by amalgamations and the COVID-19 pandemic, the first term from 9 September 2017 expired on 4 December 2021. The Mayor and Deputy Mayor are elected by the Councillors for two-year and one-year terms, respectively. The City of Canterbury Bankstown was under the management of Administrator Richard Colley and Interim General Manager Matthew Stewart until elections were held on 9 September 2017 and the first meeting of the elected Council on 26 September 2017.

Officeholders

Current composition
The most recent election was held on 4 December 2021, and the makeup of the council, by order of election, is as follows:

Heritage listings
The City of Canterbury Bankstown has a number of heritage-listed sites, including:
 Ashbury, Holden Street: Ashfield Reservoir
 Belmore, Burwood Road: Belmore railway station
 Canterbury, Bankstown railway: Canterbury railway station, Sydney
 Canterbury, 9 Fore Street: Bethungra, Canterbury
 Canterbury, Sugar House Road: Old Sugarmill
 Condell Park, Corner of Marion and Edgar Street: Bankstown Bunker
 Earlwood, Pine Street: Cooks River Sewage Aqueduct
 Earlwood, Unwin Street: Wolli Creek Aqueduct

International relations

Sister cities
The City of Canterbury Bankstown has 7 sister cities.

See also

 Local government areas of New South Wales

References

External links
City of Canterbury-Bankstown website

 

 
Local government areas in Sydney
2016 establishments in Australia
Hume Highway
South Western Sydney
Georges River